A hymenotomy is a medical procedure involving the surgical removal or opening of the hymen. It is often performed on patients with an imperforate or septate hymen, or other situations where the hymen is unusually thick or rigid such as microperforate hymen.  In the case of a person with a hymen without any opening, an opening may be created in order to facilitate menstruation.  In situations where the opening is extremely small or the band(s) of a septate hymen limit access to the vaginal opening, the individual may elect for hymenotomy to allow for comfortable sexual penetration of their vagina, or to relieve pain or discomfort that occurs when inserting/removing tampons. Sexual intercourse would not normally be adversely affected by a hymenotomy.

See also
 Hymenorrhaphy
 List of surgeries by type

References

External links
 Imperforate hymen - eMedicine article

Gynecological surgery
Surgical removal procedures
Vagina
Hymen